Genti Lasku (born 24 March 1985) is an Albanian professional basketball player who plays for BC Tirana in the Albanian Basketball Superliga as well as the Albania national team. He holds the record for the most points scored in a game in Albania, as he scored 100 points in a match between BC Tirana and Flamurtari on 16 April 2016.

References

1985 births
Living people
Albanian men's basketball players
Point guards
Basketball players from Tirana